Klosterman is a surname. Notable people with the surname include:

Chuck Klosterman (born 1972), American writer
Don Klosterman (disambiguation), multiple people
Gail Klosterman, fictional character in The Last Man on Earth
Steve Klosterman, American volleyball player

See also
Klostermann